A Collection of Roxette Hits: Their 20 Greatest Songs! is the fourth greatest hits compilation album by Swedish pop duo Roxette, released on 18 October 2006 by Roxette Recordings and Capitol to celebrate 20 years since the release of their debut album, Pearls of Passion. It was issued in conjunction with a six-disc box set, The Rox Box/Roxette 86–06. The duo recorded "One Wish" and "Reveal" in June 2006, their first songs recorded as a duo since vocalist Marie Fredriksson's brain tumour diagnosis four years earlier.

Original deluxe editions of the record featured a bonus DVD containing 18 music videos. It was a commercial success upon release, and went on to be certified gold or platinum in several territories, namely Germany, Ireland, Sweden, Switzerland and the United Kingdom. In 2011, the compilation was reissued in numerous territories to coincide with dates of The Neverending World Tour—this version included the Ballad & Pop Hits – The Complete Video Collection as its bonus DVD. This version was the first to appear on the Australian Album Chart, peaking within the top twenty.

Background and production
The compilation contains two new songs, "One Wish" and "Reveal", which were both released as singles. These were the first new tracks recorded by the duo following vocalist Marie Fredriksson's brain tumour diagnosis in 2002. The songs were recorded and produced by Per Gessle alongside frequent collaborators Clarence Öfwerman and Christoffer Lundquist in June 2006 at The Aerosol Grey Machine in Skåne—a studio where Gessle had recorded the majority of his other work since Fredriksson's diagnosis, including his solo albums Mazarin (2003) and Son of a Plumber (2005), as well as Gyllene Tider's comeback album, Finn 5 fel! (2004). Gessle later said it was a "big mistake to record ["One Wish" and "Reveal"] in Skåne. Marie didn't feel comfortable there. I think she felt excluded."

Critical reception

James Christopher Monger of AllMusic incorrectly described the compilation as containing just four singles, along with twelve album tracks and two "new cuts, and a couple of remixes", but said that the album "dutifully sums up the hook-filled careers" of Fredriksson and Gessle, whom he called "Swedish pop masters". He also commented on the conjunctive release of this compilation with The Rox Box/Roxette 86–06, writing: "Longtime fans who balked at the group's mammoth six-disc box set will find this concise and impossibly catchy compilation a whole lot easier to digest, both cerebrally and monetarily."

Mike Schiller of PopMatters gave the album a positive review, calling it "the best [Roxette] compilation out there for a pseudo-fan simply looking for all the radio tunes", and saying: "The first half of this collection is full of songs that any child of the late '80s will absolutely recognize, even if the immediate recollection is met with a bit of a blush." He also lamented the duo's drop in popularity in the United States in the late '90s, writing: "Given the latter half of the album, [that's] kind of a shame, because the straightforward, fairly rocking "Sleeping in My Car", and the rather lovely "Milk and Toast and Honey" (which sounds like Dido before Dido was Dido) could have livened up the American pop landscape that had so unfortunately passed them by. Heck, even "Stars" could have made some noise as the best "Ray of Light" knockoff out there." Anders Nunstedt of Swedish publication Expressen was more critical, complaining that the new songs were inferior to the unreleased tracks contained on prior compilations The Ballad Hits (2002) and The Pop Hits (2003), but said that, during their early '90s peak, Roxette "scored an ideal radio sound and made precise pop songs in a different class than the competition".

Track listing

Charts

Weekly charts

Year-end charts

Certifications

References

2006 greatest hits albums
Roxette compilation albums
EMI Music Sweden compilation albums